Illieston House, also known as Illieston Castle, is a castle located in West Lothian, Scotland, by the River Almond near Broxburn.

Description 
The castle is a T-plan design, 2 storeys tall, with an attic, slated roof, and an additional kitchen wing. It has gabled dormers, and a stair-tower on the south side. There is an additional 2nd stair-turret from the 2nd storey leading to a watch-chamber at the top of the main stair-tower.

The modern interior includes four bedrooms and three reception rooms over three levels, plus a "turret room". The kitchen wing includes a separate laundry room and small lobby, beside a walled garden.

History

Origins to 18th century
The Stewart kings James II and James IV are said to have had a hunting lodge at Illieston. The castle was built on the slopes of the River Almond some time around 1600 for a branch of the Hamilton family. It was acquired by John Ellis in 1663 or 1664, who added a gateway inscribed with his initials in 1665. The name Illieston may be a variation on the name Elliston. The Roman name Halistonium was previously used for the area.

The 17th-century lawyer John Lauder of Fountainhall described the house in 1668, referring to it as "Hyliston". He mentions that the Hamilton family had been Catholics and had a chamber for a priest. The house was strongly built with a kitchen on the ground floor and a hall on the first floor hung with tapestry. Lauder heard that James VI of Scotland had advanced 20,000 merks towards the cost of building the house, as it suited his hunting on nearby Drumshorling moor. Some of the window shutters had the carved dates 1613 or 1614. John Ellis owned a portrait of his kinsman John Scot, Lord Scotstarvit.

John Ellis had obtained his first charter of Illieston during the years of the British Interregnum, so the Hamilton family were able to claim the property back under laws of "non-entry". According to John Lauder, John Ellis's son-in-law, the lawyer and author James Anderson, helped the Hamiltons regain the property for "filthy lucre" after the Ellis heir died in 1686.

The castle eventually passed back to the Hamilton family in 1693, and to James Hope-Johnstone, 3rd Earl of Hopetoun in 1765.

19th to 21st century
By 1856 it had fallen into disrepair, and was restored by architect William Burn.

In 1950 it was bought by the Brownlee family to use as a private residence, and as of 2017 still farm the surrounding land. The building was bought by Nicholas Schellenber in 2007, who modernised the property.
Schellenber also experimented with solar panels. Part of it was rented out on Airbnb and then listed for sale by 2018, which attracted some media attention as one of the most expensive West Lothian properties in recent years. It sold for £890,000 including approximately 20 acres of land and separate bothy.

References

Further reading

External links

 Illieston Castle Canmore entry

Castles in West Lothian
Category B listed buildings in West Lothian